"Uptown Anthem" is a 1992 song by hip-hop group Naughty by Nature. It was made for the soundtrack for the movie Juice. Naughty by Nature rapper Treach had a cameo acting role in the movie. Rapper 2Pac, who stars in the film, is featured in the video.

The song peaked at No. 27 on the Hot Rap Singles chart and No. 58 on the Hot R&B Singles chart. It was also included as the final track and the last single from the group's 1991 second album Naughty by Nature.

Jermaine Dupri sampled "Uptown Anthem" for the Jagged Edge track "Shady Girl" from the album Hard.

Rapper Tupac Shakur sampled the song for his "Intro/Bomb First (My Second Reply)".

The song appeared in the 2016 video game Watch Dogs 2.

References

1991 songs
1992 singles
Naughty by Nature songs
Tommy Boy Records singles
Hardcore hip hop songs
Songs written by Treach
Songs written by KayGee
Songs written by Vin Rock
Song recordings produced by Naughty by Nature